Xennella is a genus of nematodes belonging to the family Xennellidae.

The species of this genus are found in Europe.

Species:

Xennella cephalata 
Xennella filicaudata 
Xennella metallica 
Xennella suecica

References

Nematodes